Deadly Duo is a 1962 American mystery film.

Plot

After her auto-racing son is killed in a crash, wealthy Leonora wants custody of her grandson. Her daughter-in-law Sabena absolutely refuses, even when Leonora's attorney, Preston Morgan, approaches her with an offer of $500,000.

Sabena's twin sister, Dara, wants the money, no matter what. She and her accomplice Jay Flagg scheme to push Sabena's car off a cliff, then collect the half-million dollars for themselves. Their plot is foiled, however, and while Leonora sees the error of her ways, Sabena develops a romantic interest in Morgan.

Cast
 Craig Hill as Morgan
 Marcia Henderson as Sabena / Dara
 Irene Tedrow as Leonora
 Robert Lowery as Jay Flagg
 Dayton Lummis as Fletcher

See also
 List of American films of 1962

References

External links

1962 films
1960s English-language films
American black-and-white films
1960s mystery films
American mystery films
Films produced by Edward Small
Films about twin sisters
United Artists films
Films directed by Reginald Le Borg
Films scored by Richard LaSalle
1960s American films